Ess na Larach is a waterfall in Glenariff Forest Park, County Antrim, Northern Ireland. It lies along Glenariff River.

References

Waterfalls of Northern Ireland
Geography of County Antrim